Second Youth may refer to:

 Second Youth (1924 film), an American silent comedy romance
 Second Youth (1938 film), a Polish romantic drama